Khin Poe Panchi (pronounced Khin Poe Bagyi, b.  2003) is a Burmese traditional and folk singer, with a repertoire spanning multiple genres including Buddhist Dhamma songs and the Mahagita, the corpus of Burmese classical songs.

Khin won a gold medal at the National Performing Arts Competition. She has released several albums including Me Yway Lo Hsin Ba Me (မယ်ရွေးလို့ဆင်ပါ့မယ်) in 2015, Auspicious Moment (မင်္ဂလာအခါတော်) in 2019, and Magnificent Almsgiving (ခမ်းနားတဲ့အလှူ) in 2020. In 2019, she performed the theme song "Until We Meet Again" for the blockbuster film The Only Mom.

Discography 

 Auspicious Moment (မင်္ဂလာအခါတော်) (2019)
 Magnificent Almsgiving (ခမ်းနားတဲ့အလှူ) (2020)

References

External links

Living people
21st-century Burmese women singers
Year of birth missing (living people)